"Unter Deiner Flagge" (Under Your Flag) is the third single from Unheilig's album Grosse Freiheit. Like the previous two singles, it was released as a two-track single and a limited edition disc with a poster included.

Track listing

Charts

Year-end charts

References 

2010 singles
2010 songs
Unheilig songs
Vertigo Records singles